This is a list of diplomatic missions in Afghanistan. There are currently 13 embassies in Kabul (November 2022).

Embassies in Kabul

Other posts in Kabul

Gallery

Consular missions

Herat 

 (Consulate-General)

Jalalabad 
 (Consulate-General)

Kandahar 
 (Consulate-General)
 (Consulate-General)

Mazar-i-Sharif  
 (Consulate-General)
 (Consulate-General)

Accredited embassies 
Resident in Islamabad, Pakistan unless otherwise noted

 

 (Nur-Sultan)
 (Tashkent)

 (New Delhi)

 (New Delhi)
 (Kuwait City)
 (Tehran)

 (New Delhi)
 (Moscow)
 (Istanbul)
 
 (Moscow)
 (New York City)
 (Moscow)
 (Tallinn)
 (Tehran)
 (Ashgabat)
 (New York City)

 (Oslo)
 (Abu Dhabi)
 (Doha)
 (Tehran)
 
 (Tehran)
 (Istanbul)
 (Tashkent)

 (New Delhi)

 (Tehran)
 (New Delhi)
 (New Delhi)
 (Valletta)
 (Tehran)
 (New York City)
 

 (Doha)
 (Tehran)
 

 (New Delhi)
 (New Delhi)

 (Kuwait City)
 

 (Doha)
 

 (Tehran)

 (Kuwait City)
 (Riyadh)
 (Riyadh)
 
 (Doha)
 (Doha)
 (Tehran)
 (Tehran)

 (Tehran)
 (Beijing)

Former embassies 
Embassy closed in 2021 unless otherwise noted.

 (2015)
 (2018)

 (2015) 
 (2017)

 (2014)

 (2013)

 United States

 (1992)

References 

 
Afghanistan
Missions